In Canadian constitutional law, the doctrine of paramountcy establishes that where there is a conflict between valid provincial and federal laws, the federal law will prevail and the provincial law will be inoperative to the extent that it conflicts with the federal law. Unlike interjurisdictional immunity, which is concerned with the scope of the federal power, paramountcy deals with the way in which that power is exercised.

The only exception to the doctrine is under section 94A of the Constitution Act, 1867, which allows both the federal government and the provinces to make laws for old age pensions and supplementary benefits, but, to the extent of any conflict, the provincial law is paramount over the federal law.

Nature of the doctrine

Paramountcy is relevant where there is conflicting federal and provincial legislation.  As Justice Major explained in Rothmans:

Claims in paramountcy may arise from two different forms of conflict:

 Operational conflict between federal and provincial laws, such that dual compliance is impossible.
 Where dual compliance is possible, but the provincial law is incompatible with the purpose of federal legislation, thus frustrating a federal purpose. To determine whether the impugned legislation frustrates a federal purpose, it is necessary to consider the regulatory framework that governs the matter in question. The party seeking to invoke the doctrine of federal paramountcy bears the burden of proof.

History

Development
The doctrine was first expressed in the Local Prohibition Case, and was subsequently described by Lord Dunedin in Grand Trunk v. Attorney General of Canada thus:

Historically, the doctrine was interpreted very strictly. When there was any overlap between federal or provincial laws the federal law would always render the provincial law inoperative even if there was no conflict. Over time courts and academics began to interpret the power as only applying where conformity to one law would necessarily violate the other. The Supreme Court of Canada adopted such an interpretation in the decision of Smith v. The Queen. The Court held that there must be an "operational incompatibility" between the laws in order to invoke paramountcy.

The modern paramountcy doctrine was articulated in Multiple Access v. McCutcheon. In that case, both the provincial and federal governments had enacted virtually identical insider trading legislation. The Supreme Court of Canada found that the statutory duplication did not invoke paramountcy as the court had the discretion to prevent double penalties. Instead, paramountcy could only be invoked when the compliance with one means the breach of the other. A later example was in the decision Law Society of British Columbia v. Mangat, where the Court found an operational conflict between the provincial Legal Profession Act prohibiting non-lawyers from appearing in front of a judge and the federal Immigration Act, which allowed non-lawyers to appear before the immigration tribunal.

Tensions in the two-branch test
The extent to which each branch of the paramountcy test can apply was explored in several cases decided by the Supreme Court of Canada in November 2015, which have come to be known as the "paramountcy trilogy." The majority in each of these held that:

"Operational conflict" is to be construed broadly, using a more substantive, contextual, and purposive approach, and it is not necessary to consider whether dual compliance would be impossible.
"Federal purpose" requires a more in-depth analysis and interpretation of the federal statute in order to ensure that it is properly identified. To that end, decision makers should not search high and low for it, as too broad a characterization can have the unwanted effect of improperly impairing provincial legislative authority.

Justice Côté wrote vigorous dissents in all three cases, arguing that the majority's interpretation of the first branch conflicts with the clear standard of impossibility of dual compliance as a result of an express conflict expressed in prior jurisprudence, which was succinctly expressed in Multiple Access as "where one enactment says 'yes' and the other says 'no'; 'the same citizens are being told to do inconsistent things'; compliance with one is defiance of the other." As well, the majority's interpretation of the second branch conflicts with the Court's prior ruling in Mangat, in that "harmonious interpretation of both federal and provincial legislation cannot lead this Court to disregard obvious purposes that are pursued in federal legislation."

See also 

 Federal preemption and the Supremacy clause for the US context
 Section 109 of the Constitution of Australia
State preemption

References

Significant cases

Further reading

 
 
 
 
 

Constitution of Canada
Federalism in Canada